Vasant Vasudeo Paranjpe was an Indian diplomat and an expert on China. In 1947, he came to China to study the Chinese language at Beijing University. He later worked in China, until 1957. He served as the interpreter when Nehru visited China and served as the interpreter between the Indian and Chinese delegations, translating directly between Jawaharlal Nehru and Mao Zedong in 1954. From 1974 to 1976 he was ambassador to Addis Ababa. In 1977 he was made India's ambassador to South Korea.

See also
 Sino-Indian relations

References

External links
 V. V. Paranjpe, "How to understand China"

Indian diplomats
Living people
Year of birth missing (living people)